South Crocker Mountain is a mountain located in Franklin County, Maine. South Crocker Mountain is flanked to the north by Crocker Mountain, and to the southwest by Mount Redington.

The northeast and southeast faces of South Crocker Mountain drain into the South Branch of the Carrabassett River, which flows into the Kennebec River, and into the Gulf of Maine. The west face of South Crocker drains into Nash Stream, thence into the South Branch of the Dead River, Flagstaff Lake, the Dead River, another tributary of the Kennebec.

The Appalachian Trail, a  National Scenic Trail from Georgia to Maine, traverses the summit of South Crocker Mountain, running north along the ridge to Crocker, and east across Caribou Valley to Sugarloaf Mountain.

See also 
 List of mountains in Maine

References

Mountains of Franklin County, Maine
Mountains on the Appalachian Trail
New England Four-thousand footers